Raymond Jungles is an American landscape architect and founder of Raymond Jungles Inc. in Miami, Florida.  Jungles primarily focuses on private gardens and resort hotels in Florida and the Caribbean region.  The American Society of Landscape Architects has honored Jungles with thirty-five design awards and the University of Florida named him its Most Distinguished Alumni in 2000.  Two of his earliest influences are Luis Barragán and Roberto Burle Marx.

Professional accomplishments
2005 Award of Excellence / Florida Chapter, ASLA / 
2001	Frederic B. Stresau Award of Excellence / Florida Chapter, ASLA / Dunn Garden Award of Excellence / Florida Chapter, ASLA / Hyatt Windward Point Resort
"Landscape Architect of the Year" / Miami Chapter, American Institute of Architects
2001 Frederic B. Stresau Award of Excellence / Florida Chapter, ASLA/Island Modern

References

Living people
American landscape and garden designers
American landscape architects
Architects from Miami
Year of birth missing (living people)